Surrender is a single by the synthpop band Suicide, written by its members Martin Rev and Alan Vega. It was released as a single in 1988 by Chapter 22.

Formats and track listing 
All songs written by Martin Rev and Alan Vega
UK 12" single (CHAP 36)
"Surrender" – 3:48
"Rain of Ruin" – 4:03

Personnel
Adapted from the Surrender liner notes.
Suicide
 Martin Rev – keyboards
 Alan Vega – vocals
Production and additional personnel
 Joe Barbaria – engineering
 Ric Ocasek – production

Charts

Release history

References

External links 
 

1988 songs
1988 singles
Suicide (band) songs
Island Records singles
Songs written by Martin Rev
Songs written by Alan Vega
Song recordings produced by Ric Ocasek